Formiphantes is a monotypic genus of dwarf spiders containing the single species, Formiphantes lephthyphantiformis. It was first described by Michael I. Saaristo & A. V. Tanasevitch in 1996.

See also
 List of Linyphiidae species (A–H)

References

Linyphiidae
Monotypic Araneomorphae genera